Ihering's three-striped opossum (Monodelphis iheringi), is an opossum species found in Argentina and Brazil.

References

Opossums
Marsupials of South America
Mammals of Brazil
Mammals of Argentina
Mammals described in 1888
Taxa named by Oldfield Thomas